Kingsport is a city in Sullivan and Hawkins counties in the U.S. state of Tennessee. As of the 2020 census, its population was 55,442. Lying along the Holston River,  Kingsport is commonly included in what is known as the Mountain Empire, which spans a portion of southwest Virginia and the mountainous counties in northeastern Tennessee. It is the largest city in the Kingsport–Bristol metropolitan area, which had a population of 307,614 in 2020. The metro area is a component of the larger Tri-Cities region of Tennessee and Virginia, with a population of 508,260 in 2020.

The name "Kingsport" is a simplification of "King's Port", originally referring to the area on the Holston River known as King's Boat Yard, the head of navigation for the Tennessee Valley.

History

Kingsport was developed after the Revolutionary War, at the confluence of the North and South Forks of the Holston River. In 1787 it was known as "Salt Lick" for an ancient mineral lick. It was first settled along the banks of the South Fork, about a mile from the confluence. The Long Island of the Holston River is near the confluence, which is mostly within the present-day corporate boundaries of Kingsport. The island was an important site for the Cherokee, colonial pioneers and early settlers, and specifically mentioned in the 1770 Treaty of Lochaber.

Early settlements at the site were used as a staging ground for other pioneers who were traveling overland on the Wilderness Road leading to Kentucky through the Cumberland Gap. First chartered in 1822, Kingsport became an important shipping port on the Holston River. Goods originating for many miles around from the surrounding countryside were loaded onto barges for the journey downriver to the Tennessee River at Knoxville.

In the Battle of Kingsport (December 13, 1864) during the Civil War, a force of 300 Confederates under Colonel Richard Morgan stopped a larger Union force for nearly two days. An army of over 5,500 troops under command of Major General George Stoneman  had left Knoxville to raid Confederate targets in Virginia: the salt works at Saltville, the lead works at Wytheville, and the iron works in Marion. Out-numbered, out-flanked, and demoralised by the bitter winter weather, Col. Morgan surrendered. The Confederates suffered 18 dead, and 84 prisoners of war were sent to a Union prison in Knoxville.

The city lost its charter after a downturn in its fortunes precipitated by the Civil War.

On September 12, 1916, Kingsport residents demanded the death of circus elephant Mary (an Asian elephant that performed in the Sparks World-famous Shows Circus). She had killed city hotel worker Walter Eldridge, who was hired by the circus the day before as an assistant elephant trainer. Eldridge was attacked and killed by the elephant while he was leading her to a pond. The elephant was impounded by the local sheriff. Leaders of several nearby towns threatened to prevent the circus from performing if it included the elephant. The circus owner, Charlie Sparks, reluctantly decided that the only way to quickly resolve the situation was to hold a public execution. On the following day, she was transported by rail to Erwin, Tennessee, where a crowd of over 2,500 people assembled in the Clinchfield Railroad yard to watch her hang from a railroad crane.

Re-chartered in 1917, Kingsport was an early example of a "garden city". Part of it was designed by city planner and landscape architect John Nolen of Cambridge, Massachusetts. It was nicknamed as the "Model City" from this plan, which organized the town into areas for commerce, churches, housing and industry. Most of the land on the river was devoted to industry. Most of the Long Island is now occupied by Eastman Chemical Company, which is headquartered in Kingsport. As part of this plan, Kingsport built some of the earliest traffic circles (roundabouts) in the United States.

Into the 1950s, two important public works projects were constructed: the Boone Dam and the Fort Patrick Henry Dam, hydroelectric dams built along the South Fork Holston River. Kingsport was among the first municipalities to adopt a city manager form of government, to professionalize operations of city departments. It developed its school system based on a model promoted by Columbia University. Pal's Sudden Service, a regional fast-food restaurant chain, opened its first location in 1956 and is headquartered in Kingsport. In 2001, Pal's Sudden Service, won the Malcolm Baldrige National Quality Award, becoming the first restaurant company to receive the award.

Geography

Kingsport is located in western Sullivan County at  (36.5369, −82.5421), at the intersection of U.S. Routes 11W and 23. Kingsport is the northwest terminus of Interstate 26. US 11W leads east  to Bristol and southwest  to Rogersville, while US 23 leads north  to Big Stone Gap, Virginia.

The city is bordered to the west by the town of Mount Carmel, to the southeast by unincorporated Colonial Heights, and to the northeast by unincorporated Bloomingdale. The Kingsport city limits extend west into Hawkins County and north to the Virginia border.

Most of the water area is in the South Fork Holston River.

Climate

Neighborhoods
There are several neighborhoods located within or just outside of Kingsport, offering different lifestyles:

 Allandale
 Amersham
 Bloomingdale
 Borden Village
 Carter's Valley
 Cliffside
 Colonial Heights
 Cooks Valley
 Downtown
 Edinburgh
 Fairacres
 Fort Robinson
 Gibson Town
 Green Acres
 Highland Park
 Hillcrest
 Huntington Hills
 Indian Springs (Fall Creek & Airport)
 Litz Manor
 Lynn Garden
 Malabar Heights
 Meadowview
 Midtown
 Morrison City
 Orebank
 Preston Forest
 Preston Hills
 Ridgefields
 Riverfront
 Riverview
 Rock Springs
 Sevier Terrace
 Sullivan Gardens
 Tellico Hills
 White City

Demographics

2020 census

As of the 2020 United States census, there were 55,442 people, 23,640 households, and 14,273 families residing in the city.

2000 census
As of the census of 2000, there were 44,905 people, 19,662 households and 12,642 families residing in the city. The population density was 1,018.9 per square mile (393.4/km2). There were 21,796 housing units at an average density of 494.6 per square mile (191.0/km2).  The racial makeup of the city was 93.32% White, 4.07% African American, 0.79% Asian, 0.24% American Indian/Alaska Native,  0.02% Native Hawaiian/Pacific Islander, 0.34% some other race, and 1.06% two or more races. Hispanic or Latino of any race were 1.05% of the population.

There were 19,662 households, of which 26.5% had children under the age of 18 living with them, 48.5% were married couples living together, 12.7% had a female householder with no husband present, and 35.7% were non-families. 32.5% of all households were made up of individuals, and 14.7% had someone living alone who was 65 years of age or older. The average household size was 2.22, and the average family size was 2.80.

In the city, the population was spread out, with 21.7% under the age of 18, 6.5% from 18 to 24, 26.2% from 25 to 44, 25.3% from 45 to 64, and 20.3% who were 65 years of age or older. The median age was 42 years. For every 100 females, there were 84.1 males. For every 100 females age 18 and over, there were 79.4 males.

The median income for a household in the city was $30,524, and the median income for a family was $40,183. Males had a median income of $33,075 versus $23,217 for females. The per capita income for the city was $20,549. About 14.2% of families and 17.1% of the population were below the poverty line, including 24.9% of those under age 18 and 13.0% of those age 65 or over.

Government

Municipal
Kingsport uses the council-manager system, which was established in 1917 when the city was re-chartered. Kingsport is governed locally by a seven-member Board of Mayor and Aldermen. The citizens elect the mayor to a two-year term and the six aldermen to four-year terms. The elections take place in odd-numbered years, with the mayor and three aldermen elected every two years. New terms begin on July 1. The board elects a vice mayor from among the six aldermen. The council or board then hires a professional city manager.

In late 2021, or early 2022, the board decided to move the election to coincide with the primary elections in Tennessee in August of every even-numbered year. This changes the Mayoral and Alderman election from May 2023 to August of 2024.

Current composition of BMA

Past municipal election results
In May of 2021, incumbent Mayor Patrick Shull fought off three challengers, but won with 63.8% of the vote.

Aldermen Collette George (who also serves as a county commissioner for Sullivan County) and Betsy M Cooper ran for re-election to another 4 year term and won. Alderman Jennifer Adler decided not to run for re-election. Political newcomer Paul Montgomery won the most votes in race beating out Bob Harshbarger (son of Congresswoman Diana Harshbarger), Joe Carr (who ran for Mayor in 2019, and was later elected to the Sullivan County Commission), Sara Buchanan, Wesley Combs, Gerald Sensabaugh (the former Safety for the Dallas Cowboys), and J.S. Moore.

State
The Sullivan County portion of Kingsport is represented in the Tennessee House of Representatives by the 1st and 2nd State Representative districts and the Hawkins County portion by the 6th district. Currently serving in these positions are Representatives John Crawford, Bud Hulsey, and Scotty Campbell respectively. In the Tennessee State Senate, the Sullivan County portion of Kingsport is represented by the 4th Senatorial District and the Hawkins County portion by the 8th district. State Senator Jon Lundberg and State Senator Frank Niceley currently serve in these positions. All of these elected officials are members of the Republican Party.

Federal
Kingsport is represented in the United States House of Representatives by Republican Diana Harshbarger of the 1st congressional district.

Economy
Eastman Chemical Company has its world headquarters in Kingsport. Domtar operates a paper mill in Kingsport. Domtar has temporarily shut this plant down from uncoated freesheet paper manufacturing and plans to convert the plant by 2023 to be able to create containerboard. Holston Army Ammunition Plant operated by BAE Systems' Ordnance Systems, Inc. manufactures a wide range of secondary detonating explosives for the Department of Defense.

In 2019, Kingsport's gross metropolitan product was reported to be .

Education

Colleges and universities
While no college or university has its main campus within the city, these institutions have branch campuses in Kingsport:

East Tennessee State University 
King University
Lincoln Memorial University
Milligan University
Northeast State Community College

King, Lincoln Memorial, Milligan and Northeast State are all located in the Kingsport Academic Village complex in downtown Kingsport. East Tennessee State offers general education courses in the Hawkins County (westernmost) portion of the city, with more advanced courses at the Academic Village.

Primary and secondary
Residents of Kingsport are served by the Kingsport City Schools public school system. It operates eight elementary schools, two middle schools, and one high school. In addition, Kingsport has eight private academies, most with religious affiliation.

List of Kingsport city schools

 John Adams Elementary School
 Andrew Jackson Elementary School
 Andrew Johnson Elementary School
 John F. Kennedy Elementary School
 Abraham Lincoln Elementary School
 Theodore Roosevelt Elementary School
 Thomas Jefferson Elementary School
 George Washington Elementary School
 Ross N. Robinson Middle School
 John Sevier Middle School
 Dobyns-Bennett High School
 Cora Cox Academy (formerly New Horizons Alternative School)
 Dobyns-Bennett Excel

Former school for African Americans
Douglass High School in Kingsport was one of the largest African American high schools in the region when it closed for desegregation in 1966. The school's former building on East Walnut Avenue (now East Sevier Avenue) was a historic Rosenwald School, built in 1929–30 with a combination of funds from the city, private citizens and the Rosenwald Fund. Although during the years of segregation the Douglass Tigers football team was not allowed to play white teams, the Tigers won a Tennessee state football championship a state basketball championship in 1946, and a state basketball championship in 1948. The present building, built in 1951 at 301 Louis Street, is now the V.O. Dobbins Sr. Complex, named for Douglass' former principal.

Human resources

Medical
Kingsport is the location of two hospitals, both operated by Ballad Health:
Holston Valley Medical Center
Indian Path Community Hospital

Military
 The vessel SS Kingsport Victory, which later became USNS Kingsport, was named in honor of the city.

Police

Kingsport Police Department is the municipal law enforcement agency for the City of Kingsport.

As of 2021, the KPD consisted of 120 sworn officer positions, plus about 40 full-time support staff, including records, jail,  maintenance and dispatch. 

KPD has numerous specialized divisions to address the needs of the city, including Criminal Investigations, VICE and Narcotics, Traffic, Search and Rescue, Bomb Squad, and SWAT.

Media

Newspapers
 Kingsport Times-News
 Daily News

Television
 WKPT-TV (COZI TV 19)
 WAPK-CD (MeTV 36)
Kingsport shares a television market with Johnson City and Bristol, VA. WCYB-TV (NBC; THE CW on DT2) in Bristol, WEMT-TV (FOX) in Greeneville, WETP-TV (PBS) in Sneedville and WJHL-TV (CBS; ABC on DT2 aka ABC Tri-Cities) in Johnson City.

AM radio
 WKPT
 WHGG

FM radio
 WTFM
 WRZK
 WCQR
 WKOS
 WCSK

Culture

Sports

The city is home to the Kingsport Axmen, a collegiate summer baseball team of the Appalachian League. The nickname is in reference to frontiersman Daniel Boone, who began the Wilderness Road in Kingsport. The Axmen play their home games at Hunter Wright Stadium, which is named after former mayor Hunter Wright.

Professional baseball was first played in Kingsport, by the Kingsport Indians in the Appalachian League from 1921 to 1925. The team went dormant for 12 years before it returned to the circuit as the Kingsport Cherokees from 1938 to 1955—with the exception of the 1942 season as the Kingsport Dodgers and as members of the Mountain States League in 1953 and 1954. The club was later known as the Kingsport Orioles (1957), Kingsport Pirates (1960–1963), Kingsport Royals (1969–1973), and Kingsport Braves (1974–1979). The Kingsport Mets were members of the Appy League from 1980 to 2020, except for the 1983 season when the New York Mets temporarily relocated the team to Sarasota, Florida, as the Gulf Coast League Mets, while their home ballpark was being renovated. In conjunction with a contraction of Minor League Baseball beginning with the 2021 season, the Appalachian League was reorganized as a collegiate summer baseball league, and the Mets were replaced by the Axmen, a new franchise in the revamped league designed for rising college freshman and sophomores.

Recreation

The Kingsport Parks and Recreation manages several parks within the city.
 Bays Mountain Park
 Borden Park
 Dogwood Park
 Edinburgh Park
 Kingsport Greenbelt Walking/Cycling Trail
 Riverview Splash Pad
 Scott Adams Skate Park
 Warrior's Path State Park

Notable people

Lisa Alther, author, born and grew up in Kingsport
 Edward L. Ayers, Bancroft Prize-winning historian and ninth president of the University of Richmond, raised in Kingsport
 Barry Bales, Grammy Award-winning musician with Alison Krauss and Union Station
 James F. Barker, president of Clemson University (1999–2013)
 Nick Castle, actor who played Michael Myers in the original Halloween, was born in Kingsport and makes appearances at the local haunted houses.
 Jeff Chapman-Crane, Appalachian artist
 Harry Coover, inventor of Super Glue
 Denny Crawford, professional football player
 Amy Dalley, country music artist
 Bobby Dodd, College Football Hall of Fame inductee as both a football player (University of Tennessee) and coach (Georgia Institute of Technology)
 Bobby Eaton, professional wrestler
 Elle and Blair Fowler, online beauty retailers who spent part of their childhoods in Kingsport
 Daniel Kilgore, professional football player, Kansas City Chiefs
 Cliff Kresge, Nationwide Tour golfer who splits his time between homes in Kingsport and Florida
 Hal Lawton, President & CEO of Tractor Supply, graduate of Sullivan South High School
 Blake Leeper, Paralympic silver medallist
 Cripple Clarence Lofton, noted boogie-woogie pianist and singer, born in Kingsport
 Matt Mahaffey, musician, frontman of pop/rock band Self
 Brownie and Stick McGhee, brothers and blues musicians, grew up in Kingsport and other East Tennessee towns
 Ken Mellons, country music artist
 John Palmer, former NBC News correspondent, born in Kingsport and a graduate of Dobyns-Bennett High School
 Jimmy Quillen, member of the U.S. House of Representatives from Tennessee's 1st congressional district (1963–1997)
 John Shelton Reed, sociologist and essayist, author or editor of eighteen books, most of them dealing with the contemporary American South
 Selwa Showker "Lucky" Roosevelt, Chief of Protocol of the United States from 1982-1989 and former journalist for the Washington Post, married Archibald B. Roosevelt, grandson of President Theodore Roosevelt
 Coty Sensabaugh, cornerback for the Pittsburgh Steelers
 Gerald Sensabaugh, retired NFL cornerback, played for the Jacksonville Jaguars and the Dallas Cowboys
 LeRoy Sprankle, high school multi-sport coach, author, and general manager of the Canton Independents
 Adam Steffey, bluegrass artist
 Bill Streever, biologist and author
 Cyrus Thomas, entomologist and ethnologist 
 Steven Williams, actor who starred in 21 Jump Street and The Blues Brothers

See also
 Netherland Inn
 Old Kingsport Presbyterian Church

References

Further reading
 Long, Howard. Kingsport: A Romance of Industry. Overmountain Press (October 1993) 304 pages. 
 Spoden, Muriel Millar Clark. The Long Island of the Holston: Sacred Island of the Cherokee Nation. (1977) 32 pages. ASIN: B0006WOGAM
 Wolfe, Margaret Ripley. Kingsport Tennessee: A Planned American City.  University Press of Kentucky (November 1987) 259 pages. 
 Kingsport Tennessee: The Planned Industrial City, Kingsport Rotary Club, 1946.

External links

 City of Kingsport official website
 Kingsport History

 
Cities in Tennessee
Cities in Sullivan County, Tennessee
Cities in Hawkins County, Tennessee
Cities in Washington County, Tennessee
East Tennessee
Kingsport–Bristol metropolitan area
Populated places established in 1822
1822 establishments in Tennessee
State of Franklin
Planned cities in the United States
Company towns in Tennessee